Druid Order may refer to:

 Present day druidic orders as described in Neo-druidry  
 The historical meaning of the word Druid
 A group called The Druid Order